Santa Sofia may refer to:

 Counts di Santa Sofia, a title used in a family on the island of Malta
 Santa Sofia (grape), an Italian wine grape that is also known as Fiano

Places
 Santa Sofia d'Epiro, an Arberesh town and comune in Cosenza, Italy
 Santa Sofia, Emilia–Romagna, a comune in the Province of Forlì-Cesena in Emilia–Romagna, Italy
 Santa Sofía, Boyacá, a town and municipality in Boyacá, Colombia

Architecture 

 Santa Sofia a Via Boccea, a church in Rome, Italy, built in the 1960s
 Santa Sofia (Benevento) (8th century), a church in Benevento
 Santa Sofia, Naples (1487), a church in Naples
 Santa Sofia Church (Padua) (10th century), a church in Padua
 Santa Sofia a Via Boccea (1968), a church in Rome
 Santa Sofia (Venice) (11th century), a church in Venice
 Palazzo Santa Sofia, a palace in Mdina, Malta

See also 
 Hagia Sophia (disambiguation)
 Santa Sophia (disambiguation)
 Sofia (disambiguation)